José Ibraimo Abudo (born 16 September 1947) is a Mozambican politician who served for a time as Minister of Justice, a position created in 1994 with the first multi-party elections in Mozambican history. He is a member of FRELIMO. He is a graduate of the University of Lisbon, where he received a master's degree in corporate law.

Sources 
  see page 36 for details

1947 births
Living people
Mozambican lawyers
Mozambican expatriates in Portugal
University of Lisbon alumni
FRELIMO politicians
Government ministers of Mozambique